The Hundred Years' Croatian–Ottoman War (Stogodišnji rat protiv Turaka, Stogodišnji rat s Osmanlijama) is the name of a sequence of conflicts, mostly of relatively low intensity, ("Small War", Croatian: Mali rat) between the Ottoman Empire and the medieval Kingdom of Croatia (ruled by the Jagiellon and Zápolya dynasties), and the later Habsburg Kingdom of Croatia. Except for periods of "small" borderland warfare, the conflict also saw episodes of major conquest campaigns of Croatian land undertaken by the Ottomans especially during the 16th century.

Pope Leo X called Croatia the Antemurale Christianitatis ("Bulwark of Christianity") in 1519, given that Croatians made significant contributions to the struggle of Christian Europe against the Muslim Turks. The expansion of the Ottoman Empire in Europe was stopped  in Battle of Sisak 1593. Nevertheless, the Muslim Ottoman Empire held control over parts of Croatia from the 16th to the end of the 17th century, when most of the territories were regained in Great Turkish War, except for lands known as Turkish Croatia (roughly corresponding to modern day western Bosnia and Herzegovina) which remained in Ottoman hands permanently.

Time span 
There are several different variations about the exact length of the war. According to one group of historians, the war began with the Battle of Krbava Field in 1493, and ended with the Battle of Sisak in 1593. According to the other group of historians, the war lasted from the second half of the 15th century and into the entire 16th century. A third group of historians mark the Peace of Zsitvatorok in 1606 as the end of the war. By the end of war, Croatia was reduced to "Remnants of the Remnants" and its territory consisted of only 16,800 km2.

In light of the human and territorial loss, and also from the modern Croatian Romanticist point of view, the 15th and 16th centuries were known as the "Two centuries of Croatia in mourning" in the lyric-epic poem of Pavao Ritter Vitezović from 1703.

Background
By the mid 14th century, the Ottoman Empire established a foothold in Europe around the town of Gallipoli. From there, they expanded into the Bulgarian Empire and encircled Byzantine capital Constantinople. In 1361, the Ottomans captured Adrianople and proclaimed it their capital. Most of Moravian Serbia fell under Ottoman control following the battle of Kosovo in 1389, while Bulgaria was captured in 1396. The Serbian Despotate became an Ottoman vassal. These conquests opened the way further west and allowed the Ottomans to reach the Kingdom of Bosnia, as well as the Kingdom of Croatia and the Kingdom of Hungary. Croatia and Hungary were since 1102 in a personal union, with the territory of Croatia governed by a royal dignitary (ban). The medieval Kingdom of Slavonia was governed by a separate ban, and was not a part of the royal title. Sigismund, the king of Hungary and Croatia, led the crusade of Nicopolis against the Ottoman Empire in 1396, which resulted in the rout of the Christian army. He then turned to the strengthening of border areas in his realm. Sigismund's rule was marked with dynastic struggles. Venice took advantage of this and between 1409 and 1420 established control over Dalmatia.

The fall of Constantinople in 1453 enabled the Ottoman Empire to engage more troops in their Balkan campaigns. Bosnia was conquered by Sultan Mehmed II in May 1463, after the capture of Bobovac and the execution of Stephen Tomašević, the last Bosnian king. Ottoman forces then raided the neighbouring Croatia and Venetian Dalmatia. The valleys of the Sana and Una rivers were successfully defended by Croatian Ban Pavao Špirančić during the summer of 1463. The Ottomans then directed their incursions to the south, on the Croatian region of Krbava and around the coastal town of Senj. Špirančić was captured in battle in September and died in captivity.

King Matthias Corvinus waited until most of the Ottoman troops left the region. In the fall of 1463, Corvinus led an army and captured parts of northern Bosnia and towns along the Vrbas and Usora rivers, including the fortress of Jajce in December, after a three month siege. Croatian Ban Stephen III Frankopan took part in Corvinus's campaign. Sultan Mehmed did not immediately respond to the offensive. He established the Sanjak of Bosnia on the territory of the former Bosnian Kingdom, which became the starting point of Ottoman raids into Croatia. Corvinus appointed Slavonian nobleman Emeric Zápolya as the governor of Bosnia, in order to organize the defense.

In 1464, Mehmed gathered an army to recapture the lost territories. He arrived to Bosnia in June and began a month-long siege of Jajce, but the garrison withheld the attack. Corvinus led an offensive into northeastern Bosnia and along the Drina River, and captured Srebrenik.

Ottoman style of Warfare 

The usual Ottoman tactic consisted of persistent loot and scorching raids usually conducted by the irregular light cavalry called the akinjis. The aim of these raids, (somewhat similar to the chevauchées conducted during the Hundred Years War) was to intimidate and demoralize the local civil inhabitants, to exhaust the economic opportunities and disable the normal economic life on the frontier areas, which would soften up the enemy defense. The tactic was also known as the "little war". The regions of Krbava and Lika were initially the main targets of Ottoman raids, regularly led by local sanjak-beys. The mountains and forests of medieval Croatia provided cover for Ottoman raiding parties, enabling them to remain longer on Croatian territory. Later, the duchies of Carniola, Styria, and Carinthia, the County of Gorizia, and Venetian-held territories were targeted by these raids as well. 

On the other side, Croatian and allied Christian forces implemented counterattacks, especially in the first phases of war, when they were still able to apply the counterattacking or the offensive tactics. Even though akinji raiding parties attempted to evade hostile military formations, the armies did sometimes clash. Sometimes the local armies intercepted or pursued the raiders on their return. At that point the presence of captives which akinjis would capture as well as the heavy booty which they carried back made their return more slow and therefore vulnerable to the enemy attack such as at Battle of Una in 1483. The captives captured in these raids, were usually sold as slaves on the Ottoman slave markets.

Croatia in personal union with Hungary

Early confrontations 

In the aftermath of fall of medieval Kingdom of Bosnia to the Ottomans in 1463, Hungarian king Matthias Corvinus established the banates of Jajce and Srebrenik, which formed the centre of his new defense system. While it faced difficulties with coordination and finances, the system provided protection for northern Croatia, Slavonia, and southern Hungary from Ottoman raids, but the Adriatic coast and southern Croatia were still exposed. The fortresses of Knin, Klis, and Skradin formed the main line of defense in Croatia, while Krupa, Bihać, Otočac, and Senj formed the rear line. Later in 1469, the Captaincy of Senj was formed as a military and administrative unit within the defense system.
In 1467, Ottoman akinji plundered the surroundings of Zadar and Šibenik. This was repeated in 1468 and January 1469, along with raids around Senj and across the Kupa River into the Duchy of Carniola. Another raid into southern Croatia followed in June 1469, when several thousand people were taken captive. Estates of the Frankopan and Kurjaković families were particularly affected by these raids. The Frankopans were also struck by Corvinus's centralization measures, and were deprived of Senj and several other possessions.

In the wake of the conquest of Bosnia, the Ottomans also expanded on most of the lands of Stjepan Vukčić Kosača by 1465. The town of Mostar was captured in 1466. In this area, the Ottoman Sanjak of Herzegovina was established in 1470.

The military of the Croatian Kingdom was based on a banderial system, involving soldiers on the ban's payroll and those of the magnates and the nobles. Owing to maintenance costs and the mountainous terrain of Croatia, the infantry significantly outnumbered the cavalry. Units of the middle and lesser nobility presented the most numerous component of the Croatian armed force. These armies lacked the mobility as members of the noble families were tied to their often scattered holdings, which were vulnerable to akinji attacks. The Croatian nobles raised their troops at the request of their counts or the head of the county (župan). Such a mobilization system was slow and unable to react in time to prevent an incursion from the fast Ottoman light cavalry. While the incursions of the akinji were usually successful, the forces of the Croatian ban and local nobles sometimes intercepted Ottoman raiding groups on their way back to Ottoman-held territory. In 1475 and 1478, the counts of the Zrinski family ambushed Ottoman troops returning from a raid and defeated them in the Una Valley.

In 1476, for the sake of better military organization, the office of the Ban of Croatia was merged with that of the Ban of Slavonia, which contributed to the process of political integration of Croatia and Slavonia. The Ottoman threat did not stop internal conflicts among the Croatian and Slavonian nobility, which further undermined an efficient defense.

Battle of Krbava

Incursions continued under Sultan Bayezid II, but with less intensity than in the 1470s. The Ottomans captured Herceg Novi in 1482, completing the conquest of Kosača's realm. In 1483, an army led by Croatian Ban Matthias Geréb routed the Ottoman cavalry at the battle of Una near Novi Grad. A seven-year peace treaty between Bayezid and Corvinus was signed later in the year. By that time, the constant warfare left many villages deserted, and almost completely stopped the major trade route that went from Senj to Zagreb and further towards inner Hungary. Corvinus died in 1490 and was succeeded by Vladislaus II. As the peace treaty came to an end, the hostilities renewed. In 1491, Croatian forces defeated an Ottoman group returning from Carniola in the battle of Vrpile Gulch in Lika. This defeat forced the Ottomans to halt their attacks during the following year.

The Frankopans attempted to regain control over the town of Senj in July 1493, which was taken from them earlier by the king Matthias Corvinus in order to create Senj Captaincy (part of his defensive system). This, however, led to a conflict with Croatian Ban Emerik Derenčin. News of an Ottoman raiding party returning through Croatia towards Bosnia in August forced them to make peace. An army gathered by Derenčin, consisting of a number of Croatian nobles, attempted to block the path to the Ottomans. Derenčin decided to face the Ottoman army in an open battle, although Croatian nobles unsuccessfully insisted that making an ambush in the mountains would be a better option. On 9 September, the Croatian army clashed with the Ottoman forces near Udbina in Lika and suffered a huge defeat in the battle of Krbava Field. Ottoman strategy and tactics employed in the battle proved superior to that of the Croatian side. While the outcome of the battle was not immedietely felt, it accelerated the decline of the power of the nobility, particularly the lesser and the middle nobles.

Croatian nobility left to themselves
In 1503, King Vladislaus concluded a seven-year peace treaty with Sultan Bayezid. The Ottoman Empire kept the strategically important fortified towns of Kamengrad and Ključ, which separated the Banate of Jajce from Croatia. The treaty was renewed in 1511, but with the accession of Selim I on the Ottoman throne in 1512, all peace treaties were annulled. The Banate of Srebrenik was captured by the Ottomans in the autumn of the same year. 

In Croatia, ban Petar Berislavić continued defending the country against the Ottomans. In 1513, he won a major victory at the battle of Dubica on the Una river. He also took part in the 1518 battle of Jajce, but was ultimately killed in an Ottoman ambush at the battle of Plješevica in 1520. 

Given the fact that after Berislavić's death king did not appoint new ban of Croatia, while Venetian diplomats on Budim court even heard him saying that "Croatia means nothing to him", Croatian nobility started negotiating with the Ottomans about becoming their vassal and paying tribute.

Finally, as Belgrade fell to the Ottomans by the late 1521, king Louis appointed Ivan Karlović as new ban of Croatia. Karlović previously served as Venetian Condottiero since by defending his posesions in Croatia, he also defended Venetian lands from the Ottoman incursions. He therefore financed defense of Croatia with Venetian money. Since he had no use of Hungarian king, Karlović also established contacts with Ferdinand Habsburg who provided some troops for the defense of Croatia. His support was limited, as inner-Austrian duchies opposed the permanent stationing of their troops outside the borders of the Holy Roman Empire. Ferdinand nonetheless managed to extend his influence in Croatia.In May 1522, after two previous attempts in 1513 and 1514, Bosnian sanjak-bey Gazi Husrev-beg besieged Knin, the old capital of Croatia. Although Karlović was preparing a relief force, the commander of the Knin garrison Mihajlo Vojković surrendered the fortress. A few days later, Skradin surrendered as well. The loss of Knin gave more momentum to the Ottoman advance, while leading role in Croatia's defenses south of the Sava River fell to Bihać. Following the fall of Knin and Skradin, Habsburg supreme military commander Nicholas, Count of Salm arrived to Croatia in order to consult with Karlović about further defense from the Ottomans. Karlović resigned from position of Croatian ban in 1524 because permanent state of war against the Ottomans caused all of his possesions to get ravaged, which empoverished him severely, while on the other hand weak king of Hungary (which Croatia was formally part of) provided no help whatsoever.

Interregnum period 
In 1526, Ottoman forces led by Sultan Suleiman the Magnificent decisively defeated Hungarian army led by King Louis II at the battle of Mohács, which led to the collapse of Kingdom of Hungary. Louis, who had no heir, died in battle. Croatia and Hungary became disputed territories between Ferdinand I of the House of Habsburg, and John Zápolya, Voivode of Transylvania. Most of the Croatian nobles backed Ferdinand. On 1 January 1527, the Croatian Parliament unanimously elected Ferdinand as King of Croatia at their assembly in Cetin.

Although on election of Cetin, Ferdinand Habsburg pledged to provide both financial and military aid to Croatian nobility who elected him, in reality he soon turned out to be unable to fully keep his promises. Croatian nobility continuously asked him to invest in both reconstruction of fortifications on the borderlands towards the Ottoman Empire and send actual troops to man them. They usually argued that by defending Croatia, Ferdinand actually defends the Holy Roman Empire from the Ottoman incursions. At one point Croatians even pointed to the possibility of switching sides and actually allowing Ottoman armies freely pass through Croatia in order to attack the Holy Roman Empire. Ferdinand, however, invested most of his forces in civil war against Zapolya, could only offer limited help before the civil war with Zapolya was resolved.

Habsburg period

Ottoman advances during interregnum 
As the civil war for the Hungarian crown between Ferdinand Habsburg and John Zapolya raged, the Ottomans used the instabilities to further capture Croatian forts in Obrovac, Udbina, Komić and Mrsinj and by which they asserted their control over entire Krbava county and made ground for further advances to Lika. By April 1529, ban of Croatia Ivan Karlović wrote in his letters that the Ottoman cavalry had overrun Lika and Krbava, making them a staging ground for further attacks on Croatia and Carniola two years later.  

Jajce fell in 1528, Požega in 1536, Klis fell in 1537, Nadin and Vrana in 1538, moving the Croatian-Ottoman border to the line, roughly, Požega-Bihać-Velebit-Zrmanja-Cetina.

Katzianer's Campaign 

In 1537, after prevailing over Zapolya and as a result of continuous pressure from the Croatian nobility, Ferdinand Habsburg named one of his seasoned commanders Johann Katzianer as supreme royal captain "of our Slavonian kingdom" on joint Croatian-Slavonian parliament held in Križevci in spring of 1537. This Croatian-Slavonian parliament proclaimed the general insurrection. Bishop of Zagreb Simon Erdody was charge for the logistics of the upcoming campaign. The same parliament, however, refused to confirm Katzianer as suppreme commander, which left this important matter unresolved before launch of the offensive. An army of 24 000 men assembled near Koprivnica and marched off to Slavonia in order to chase away the Ottomans, with their main objective being town of Osijek. As Habsburg army reached Virovitica, the conflicts between different commanders enflamed, and the army ranned out of food. The autumn rains also caused maladies among soldiers, which decimated the army. As Osijek garrison was reinforced by Mehmed-beg Jahjapašić and thus became too strong to besiege it regulairly, Katzianer ordered a withdrawal. His army was intercepted by Turks and eventually ended up near Gorjani. Top commanders such as Katzianer and bishop Erdodoy escaped a night before the battle, while what remained of Katzianer's army was completely destroyed by the Ottomans in Battle of Gorjani on 9 October 1537.

Military Frontier 

The fiasco of Katzianer's Campaign made a turning point and convinced both Habsburg king and Croatian-Slavonian nobility to turn to creation of defensive buffer zone which would rely on system of fortifications in the borderlands. The old medieval fortifications in the area had to be reinforced and reconstructed in accordance with modern rennaisance standards. Likewise, the joint armies confronting the Ottomans had to be united under joint command in order to avoid discord among the commanders. The defensive system also had to be permanently and systematically well financed. This led to creation of a Military Frontier. This buffer zone, back in 16th century was divided into smaller capitancies. Several similar capitancies formed a Frontier, so for example in the area adjacent to Ottoman Slavonia, there was Slavonian Frontier. Slavonian Fromtier was further stretching to form a continuation with Croatian Frontier whose center was from 1578, newly built town of Karlovac. Carinthian, Carniolan and Styrian nobility agreed to partially finance the Military Frontier in order to hold off the Ottomans in Croatia/Slavonia and therefore prevent them from invading their own lands. Financially exhausted Croatian nobility sometimes gave their forts to Styrian/Carniolan counterparts as they had no money to mantain and defend them. Besides the regular garrisons in forts of Military Frontier, troops were also deployed in smaller square shaped wooden palisades with four defensive towers on its corners designed to protect local villagers during the Ottoman incursions.There were also high observation posts manned with guards, between the aforementioned smaller forts. In case of the enemy attack, the guard on the observation post would alert friendly troops about the approaching enemies by either firing from a gun or by igniting fire. Such organized service enabled swift mobilization in case of the Ottoman incursion.

In January 1539 king Ferdinand deployed the army of 3000-4000 Spanish mercenaries to Slavonia to man the fortifications, while Nikola Jurišić was named supreme royal captain in Slavonia in the aftermath of Katzianer's downfall. He also invited nobility of Croatian-Slavonian parliament to properly supply this newly arrived Spanish army with food and salaries.

Croatian-Slavonian parliament also decided to recruit 300 strong haramija force in order to counter frequent Ottoman martolos raids. The arrival of Spanish army in Slavonia temporairly halted the Ottoman conquests, so in period of 1539-40, there were no major territorial losses in Slavonia.    

By the end of 1540, the Ottoman Empire occupied the Croatian possessions between Skradin and Karin, eliminating them as a buffer zone between the Ottoman and Venetian territory in Dalmatia. By 1573, the remainder of the Dalmatian hinterland, now largely controlled by the Venetian cities, was even further reduced by Ottoman advances. In 1580, the Ottoman Empire formed Bosnia Eyalet (pashaluk) by uniting Bosnian, Herzegovina, Lika, Pakrac, Zvornik and Požega sanjaks while also adding it Prizren and Vučitrn sanjak. They therefore created a large province under control of Bosnian pasha which also incorporated conquered Croatian lands.

The Great Offensive of Hasan Pasha 
The last decade of 16th century began with a great Ottoman offensive against Croatia initiated and undertaken by newly appointed governor of Bosnian Eyalet - Telil Hasan Pasha. As Habsburg defences on the Military Frontier became increasingly better organised, the Ottoman Empire responded by appointing bellicose Hasan Pasha as the Ottoman governor of Bosnian Eyalet in 1591. 

Same year in spring, Ottomans constructed pontoon bridges over Sava river near Gradiška and started amassing troops in Banja Luka. In 1591 Croatian Sabor in Zagreb intelligence report came that Hasan Pasha mobilised troops from all sanjaks under his authority and is about to launch an attack on one of Croatian bordertown forts. Croatian Sabor in response proclaimed general insurrection throughout entire country.

In August 1591, Hasan Pasha's army crossed Sava river and marched off towards fort of Sisak. Various sources describe his army between 35 000-16 000 strong. He besieged the fort leading to First battle of Sisak. The Ottomans couldn't capture the fort, so they retreated back to Gradiška on August 11. Army of Slavonian Frontier and Croatian ban responded by besieging Moslavina fort and forced its garrison to surrender. In autumn same year, Hasan Pasha responed by sending a raiding party of some 5000 horsemen on a plundering raid to Slavonian military Frontier, but his raiding party was intercepted and partially destroyed by local christian captains.  On 6 November 1591, the Ottomans successfully captured the fort of Ripač. 

In 1592, Ottomans resumed their offensives against Croatia and managed to besiege and capture town of Bihać in June 1592. One month later, further warfare led to Battle of Brest which also ended in decisive Ottoman victory. The Christian defeat near Brest, however, raised an alarm through much of the Habsburg Monarchy so Christian armies started flowing in to Croatia from all over Europe. The decisive battle took place in June 1593 when Hasan Pasha attempted to capture Sisak fort for the third time as it ended in decisive christian victory. Hasan Pasha himself got killed in the battle. Soon after, much of the Christian reinforcements returned home, while Ottomans unhappy with the defeat raised new army in Rumelia which besieged Sisak for the fourth time in August 1593, and overwhelm the town garrison; far fewer in numbers and this time without the relief army coming to help them. The fall of Sisak again caused panic in Croatia as it was the last line of defence before Zagreb. The Rumelian Ottoman army which captured Sisak, however, withdrew back to Bosnia, as they had ran out of food to support their further offensive campaigns and eventually marched off to Hungary.

Aftermath 
Even though the Ottoman defeat near Sisak in June triggered the start of Long Turkish War, by the end of it, the Habsburgs managed to achieve a rather favourable peace treaty in 1606. According to Croatian historian and turkologist Nenad Moačanin, the failure of Hasan Pasha's offensive and his death near Sisak, in a way ushered in the period of 17th century, which was characterized by relative stability of Croatian-Ottoman border. Due to internal problems it was facing (mutinies, inflation, crisis of timar system), the Ottoman Empire lost the offensive potential it used to have, so Instead of making further offensive attempts against Croatia, the Ottoman Empire started bolstering its defences along the borderline with Croatian lands thus taking a more defensive posture.

International impact 
Although the Croatian Kingdom suffered major defeats in battles, it remained in existence, keeping its identity, religion, and culture under the Habsburg monarchy. In addition, some Croats in the territories lost to the Ottomans remained because the Porte embraced ethnic diversity, many of them eventually converting to Islam throughout the following centuries of Ottoman rule. The regions of Bihać and Velika Kladuša were Islamized.

The Croatian combat against the Ottomans did not remain unnoticed in the political circles of European states. Copious amounts of information from the war was written in Monumenta Hungariae Historica, Codex diplomaticus partium Regno Hungariae adnexarum from 1903 (over 600 documents).

Zones of war peril 
According to Croatian historian Ivan Jurković, the war-endangered areas could be classified in three zones:
The first zone was the territory of Kingdom of Croatia, that had no effective control by both sides, as well as the parts of Kingdom of Croatia that were heavily struck by the Ottoman military and paramilitary operations. This zone was up to 50 km deep in the Croatian territory. It mostly covered the areas along the border and the later-formed Military Frontier. The infrastructure and the supra-structure became ruined and devastated, and the economic life suffered. This zone had high rate of emigration, mostly to the second and the third zones, along with emigrations abroad.
The second zone was from time to time exposed to the raids of the Ottoman regular and irregular forces. The area was controlled by the Croatian authorities and the economic life was still somewhat functioning. Population level was steady and received a continuous inflow of displacees from the first zone. The Croatian nobles used this zone as the support point and the base for the defense or for the attempts of retaking of their estates in the first zone. These areas lived as economic support of the armies.
The third zone was mostly Ottoman raid-safe zone, in which the majority of the zone had no Ottoman raids, although few areas were subjected to Ottoman raids.

See also 

 Great Turkish War
 Croatian-Slavonian-Dalmatian theather in Great Turkish War

Footnotes

References

 
15th-century conflicts
16th-century conflicts
Croatia under Habsburg rule
Ottoman period in the history of Croatia
Wars involving Bosnia and Herzegovina during Ottoman period